Stephane Milhim (born November 20, 1990) is a former offensive guard.  He played college football at UMass.

High school career
Milhim attended Charles W. Flanagan High School in Pembroke Pines, Florida.  As an offensive lineman he was a Sun-Sentinel All-County Honorable Mention who played in the Broward County North-South All-Star game, he was also named Team MVP as a senior.

College career
Milhim signed a national letter of intent with UMass.  After redshirting in 2008 Milhim would go on to play in 40 games over the next four seasons, including starting 37 of them.  Although primarily a tackle, Milhim showed versatility over his career by playing all five positions on the offensive line.

Professional career
After being graded as a seventh-round pick in the 2013 NFL Draft, Milhim went undrafted and signed with the Jacksonville Jaguars. He was placed on injured reserve on August 7, 2013. 

Milhim was released on May 2, 2014.

References

External links
UMass Minutemen football 
ESPN profile 
Jacksonville Jaguars profile 

1990 births
Living people
People from Pembroke Pines, Florida
Players of American football from Florida
American football offensive guards
UMass Minutemen football players
Jacksonville Jaguars players